Lee Bible (May 27, 1887 March 13, 1929) was an American garage operator and a racing-car driver.

He was killed attempting to break the land-speed record on March 13, 1929, at Ormond Beach, Florida.

Early life
He was born Conway Lee Bible on a farm near Midway, Tennessee.

Pre-record attempt 

Jim White, owner of the Special, wanted the title to come back to the United States. Keech was asked to come back and drive the Triplex Special, but he declined, considering the car too dangerous.

White then offered the ride to their team mechanic and garage operator, Lee Bible, who saw this as the opportunity of a lifetime. He was declared eligible by officials after a few practice runs, despite his lack of experience.

The record attempt 

On his first run, Bible was clocked at  – well below the record. However, shortly after the time trap, the car suddenly swerved, presumably because Bible released the accelerator too fast. The Triplex Special crashed into the dunes and rolled, finally coming to a stop  further. During this crash, Bible was thrown from the car, killing him instantly. The Triplex Special rolled into a newsreel cameraman, Charles R. Traub, who was killed instantly.

See also

 List of people from Tennessee
 List of racing drivers who died in racing crashes

References 

 

1887 births
1929 deaths
19th-century American people
19th-century sportsmen
Land speed record people
Racing drivers from Tennessee
Racing drivers who died while racing
Sports deaths in Florida
Volusia County, Florida
1920s in Florida
Motorsport in Florida
1929 in American motorsport
American sportsmen